Eddie Gordon (born October 18, 1998) is an American soccer player who plays as a defensive midfielder for Union Omaha in USL League One.

Career

Youth, College & Amateur
Gordon attended Creighton Preparatory School, leading the high school team to three-straight Nebraska Class A Title games. While serving as team captain for two seasons, Gordon was also a two-time Nebraska Gatorade Player of the Year, and a two-time First Team All-Nebraska selection. Gordon was also a member of the OFC Elite club that has won three-straight Nebraska State Cup titles and was a regional semi-finalist.

In 2017, Gordon attended the University of Nebraska Omaha, going to make 77 appearances for the Mavericks, finishing his college career with three assists to his name. Gordon earned a range of honors at Omaha, including All-Summit Second Team and Summit League All-Tournament as a senior, and was a three-time selection for the CoSIDA Academic All-District Team, the Summit League All-Academic Team, and the Summit League Academic Honor Roll.

Gordon also appeared in the USL League Two for Black Rock FC during their 2021 season, making ten appearances.

Professional
On April 15, 2022, Gordon signed with USL League One club Union Omaha. He debuted for the club the following day, appearing as a 65th–minute substitute during a 0–0 draw with South Georgia Tormenta.

References

External links
 Profile at the University of Omaha Nebraska Athletics

1998 births
Living people
American soccer players
Association football midfielders
Omaha Mavericks men's soccer players
Soccer players from Nebraska
Sportspeople from Omaha, Nebraska
Union Omaha players
USL League One players
USL League Two players